Contrail was a cloud federation computing project that ran from 1 October 2010 until 31 January 2014.  Contrail produced open-source cloud stack software including Security, PaaS components, Distributed file system, Application Lifecycle management middleware, and SLA Management. Contrail supports OVF standard and runs on OpenStack and OpenNebula. Contrail software is a full IaaS + PaaS Cloud stack ready to implement Cloud Federations.

The most recent release is version 1.3, allowing: 

 Cloud federation
 SLA Management
 Usage CONtrol
 Login over Google
 XtreemFS support
 SAML Support
 OAuth2 standard
 Virtual infrastructure Network (VIN)
 Virtual Execution Platform (VEP)
 Single Sign On (SSO)* Cloud federations*PAAS*IAAS*
 Authorization Server
 Dynamic-CA
 Hadoop

Contrail is partially funded by the FP7 Programme of the European Commission under Grant Agreement FP7-ICT-257438.

Contrail also allows virtualization, alongside Infrastructure-as-a-Service, Platform-as-a-Service. and Hybrid clouds.

References

External links 
 
 Development Platform

Free software